Peter New is a Canadian actor and screenwriter, best known for his roles as Big McIntosh in My Little Pony: Friendship Is Magic and Sunil Nevla in Littlest Pet Shop.
 
In 2007, New's script "The Bar" won the first annual Hot Shot Shorts Film Contest. His short film "Woodman" is a 2017 selection at the LA Shorts Fest.

Career

New has spent most of his career as a voice actor and is known for providing voices for many cartoon and anime series.

Awards and nominations
New received a 2002 Leo Award for Best Screenwriter (Music, Comedy, or Variety Program or Series), for episode #112 of Point Blank.

Filmography

Feature films

Short films

Television
TV series

Anime roles

Video games

References

External links 
 
 
 Facebook fan page
 
 https://archive.today/20100428083110/http://www.beyondrobson.com/filmmakers/peter_new/

Living people
Canadian male film actors
Canadian male television actors
Canadian male voice actors
Year of birth missing (living people)